Valentibulla is a genus of tephritid  or fruit flies in the family Tephritidae.

Species
Valentibulla californica (Coquillett, 1894)
Valentibulla dodsoni Foote, 1987
Valentibulla munda (Coquillett, 1899)
Valentibulla mundulata Foote, 1979
Valentibulla steyskali Foote, 1977
Valentibulla thurmanae Foote, 1959

References

Tephritinae
Tephritidae genera
Diptera of North America